Kapol Thongplub () nickname; Un or Pong born 4 September 1967 at Chainat is a television programmer and actor. He hosts television programs Khon Uad Phee and Shock Station.

Work

Host

Radio Program 
 Sport Relax
 The Shock

Television Program 
 JOKER VARIETY 
 THE SHOCK ON TV
 Khon Uad Phee
 The Scary TV 
 Jarachon Game

Acting 
 Friendship
 Bangkok Haunted
 Bang Rak Soi 9

Director
The Letters of Death (2006)

Album 
 The Message 
 Peelok –  Magenta

TV Dramas 
 2004  (ไปแล้วกลับ หลับแล้วตื่น ฟื้นเพื่อเธอ) (Kantana/ITV) as Pong Kapol (ป๋อง กพล)
 2005  (มิตร ชัยบัญชา มายาชีวิต) (/Ch.7) as (นักเต้นที่เข้าร่วมฉากกับ มิตร ชัยบัญชา)
 2006  (นรกตัวสุดท้าย) (/Ch.3) as Mor Khak (หมอแขก) 
 2010  (ปอบอพาร์ทเมนท์) (Por Dee Kam/Ch.7) as (Guest role)
 2011 Jao Sao Pom Mai Chai Pee (เจ้าสาวผมไม่ใช่ผี) (Step Power 3/Ch.3) as Samlee (สำลี)
 2013  (วิวาห์ป่าช้าแตก) (/Ch.8) as Se' Kumora (Mor Pee Khmer) (เซ กูมอร่า (หมอผีเขมร)) 
 2022 Krasue Lam Sing (กระสือลำซิ่ง) (Cheer Up/Ch.8) as Pong Kapol (ป๋อง กพล) (Guest role)
 2022 Divided Heart (2022) (Sai Leurd Song Hua Jai) (สายเลือดสองหัวใจ) (SUP Entertainment/Ch.7) as Theimsak Jareindee (Hia Tong) (เติมศักดิ์ เจริญดี (เฮียตง))

TV Series 
 2017  (หล่อล่าผี) (/Thairath TV) as Pong
 20  (/Ch.) as

TV Sitcom 
 2009 Bang Rak Soi 9 (บางรักซอย 9 ตอนที่ 329 คลื่นวิทยุ..จุ๊ จุ๊ จุ๊) (Exact-Scenario/Ch.9) as (Guest role)
 20  (/Ch.) as

Movies 
 1997  (ไนน์ตี้ช็อค เตลิดเปิดโลง) (Five Star Production) as Pong Kapol (ป๋อง กพล)
 2001 Bangkok Haunted (ผีสามบาท) (Avant) as
 2002 Sin Sisters (ผู้หญิง 5 บาป) (Sahamongkol Film) as
 2008 Friendship (เฟรนด์ชิพ เธอกับฉัน) as Pong Kapol (ป๋อง กพล)
 2010 The Snow White (ผีตายทั้งกลม) (Phranakornfilm) as
 2011  (30+ โสด On Sale) (Sahamongkol Film) as Pong Kapol (ป๋อง กพล)
 2012 Mid Road Gang 2 (มะหมา 2) as
 2015 The One Ticket (ตัวพ่อเรียกพ่อ) (Sahamongkol Film) as
 2020 Check-in Shock (เกมเซ่นผี) (Major Group) as

References

External links
 

Kapol Thongplub
Kapol Thongplub
Living people
1967 births
Kapol Thongplub
Kapol Thongplub
Kapol Thongplub
Kapol Thongplub
Paranormal investigators
Kapol Thongplub
Kapol Thongplub
Kapol Thongplub
Kapol Thongplub